The U.S. state of Washington has had a system of direct voting since gaining statehood in 1889. Citizens and the state legislature both have the ability to place new legislation, or legislation recently passed by the state legislature, on the ballot for a popular vote. Washington has three types of ballot measures that can be voted on in a general election: initiatives, referendums, and legislatively referred constitutional amendments. In order to be placed on the ballot, supporters of a measure must gather signatures from registered voters. From 1898 to 1912, the only ballot measures allowed were legislatively referred constitutional amendments. In 1912, an amendment successfully passed to create a citizen-led process for initiatives and referendums, and the first successful initiative was passed in 1914.

Since adopting this process, ballot measures have become widely accepted as part of Washington's electoral system.  over 2,000 different initiatives had been filed with the state, along with a significantly smaller number of referendums. Of those, only a fraction have received the required signatures to be placed on the ballot. In recent years, ballot measures have been used to legalize politically contentious policies such as assisted suicide, same-sex marriage, and marijuana use. The use of signature gatherers (workers paid to gather signatures for ballot measures) has attracted significant controversy in the state, as has some activists' aggressive approach to ballot measures.

Background 

Washington entered the United States as a territory in 1853 and was admitted as the 42nd state on November 11, 1889. The Constitution of Washington, which had itself been approved by a vote of the people, laid out the first guidelines for ballot measures. Article XXIII, Section 1 dictated that constitutional amendments required passing by a two-thirds vote in the state legislature and being approved by a majority of voters in the next general election. This section also required that details of the amendment should be published in newspapers across the state before election day.

In 1912, Constitutional Amendment Article II, Sec. 1 passed. This amendment granted people the power to place measures on the ballot every election via petition. For one of these measures to be valid, it needed signatures of support from at least eight percent of the voting population, based on turnout from the previous election. Initiatives allowed people to propose new laws and referendums allowed people to challenge laws passed by the legislature. This system of "direct legislation" had previously been implemented in Oregon by William Simon U'Ren. In the time since this amendment's passage, initiatives and referendums have become a prominent piece of Washington's electoral landscape.

The prominence of ballot measures, especially citizen-submitted ones, has allowed Washington to lead the nation in social issues. In 1910, people approved an amendment granting women the right to vote, making Washington the fifth state to guarantee women's suffrage. The passage of Initiative Measure 1000 (the "Death with Dignity Act") in 2008 made Washington the second state in the nation to legalize assisted suicide. The following year, voters approved Referendum Measure 71, which marked the first time voters had expanded recognition of queer relationships at the ballot box. In 2012, Referendum Measure 74 passed, making Washington the ninth state to recognize same-sex marriage and the third to do so by popular vote. That same year, the passage of Initiative Measure 502 led to Washington becoming the first state to fully legalize marijuana for recreational use.

While state law on signature gathering includes a recommendation that organizers should not be paid to gather signatures, the practice of paying workers per signature gathered has been legal in Washington since 1994. Supporters of the practice claim that it allows campaigns to extend their reach and makes ballot access more accessible and point to measures that have passed with widespread public support as evidence. The practice has been criticized for potentially allowing campaigns to "buy their way onto the ballot", most notably by former Secretary of State Ralph Munro. Some paid signature gatherers have been arrested on charges of forgery and election fraud for placing fake signatures on petitions.

Since sponsoring his first measure in 1997, Tim Eyman has been the most prolific sponsor of initiatives and referendums in the state. He has had 17 initiatives placed on the ballot as of 2021, with 11 being approved. Of those, only two have not since been overturned or modified by the courts. Eyman's 2007 Initiative Measure 960 passed with 51% of the vote and created a new system of "advisory votes" for all tax increases passed by the legislature in Washington. While most of this initiative was overturned by the Washington Supreme Court in 2013, this system still stands. Advisory votes are not legally binding and exist solely to measure public approval, as such, they are not considered to be ballot measures.

Types of ballot measures

Initiatives 
There are two types of initiatives in Washington.
 Initiatives to the People are placed on the ballot and, if passed, become law. These initiatives require a number of signatures equal to or greater than eight percent of the votes cast in the previous state gubernatorial race. The signatures must be gathered over a period of six months.
 Initiatives to the Legislature are first submitted to the Washington Legislature for consideration. These initiatives require a number of signatures equal to or greater than eight percent of the votes cast in the previous state gubernatorial race. The signatures must be gathered over a period of ten months. If the legislature passes the initiative, it is enacted into law. If the legislature rejects the initiative, it is placed on the ballot for a vote of the people. If the legislature passes an alternative version, both the original and modified version will appear on the ballot.

Referendums 
There are two types of referendums in Washington.
 Referendum measures are laws that have been passed by the legislature and are up for recall. These referendums require a number of signatures equal to or greater than six percent of the votes cast in the previous state gubernatorial race.
 Referendum bills are proposed laws that are placed on the ballot by the legislature. If passed by a public vote, they become law.

Legislatively referred constitutional amendments 
Legislatively referred constitutional amendments are changes to the Washington State Constitution which have been approved by the legislature but require approval from the people. They require a two-thirds vote in the state legislature before being placed on the ballot.

1800s

1898

1900–1949

1900

1904

1906

1908

1910

1912

1914

1916

1918

1920

1922

1924

1926

1928

1930

1932

1934

1936

1938

1940

1942

1944

1946

1948

1950–1999

1950

1952

1954

1956

1958

1960

1962

1964

1966

1968

1970

1972

1973

1974

1975

1976

1977

1978

1979

1980

1981

1982

1983

1984

1985

1986

1987

1988

1989

1990

1991

1992

1993

1994

1995

1996

1997

1998

1999

2000–present

2000

2001

2002

2003

2004

2005

2006

2007

2008

2009

2010

2011

2012

2013

2014

2015

2016

2018

2019

2020

See also 
 Law of Washington (state)

Notes

References

External links 
Washington State Secretary of State: Elections: Initiatives

Washington (state) law
Ballot measures
Washington ballot measures